Manchester United Championship Soccer is a 1995 soccer video game for the Super NES. The game was released in Germany under the title Lothar Matthäus Super Soccer. A Sega Mega Drive version was planned but never released.

Gameplay
The game was released at the time when Manchester United was starting to dominate the English football scene. All the teams from the 1994–95 FA Premier League are represented. All-star teams and various European clubs that participated in the European competitions from the 1994/95 season are also included. During the gameplay the player can choose two type of views: top down and isometric view of the pitch.

Images

See also
 Manchester United (video game series)
 List of association football video games

External links

1995 video games
Association football video games
Cancelled Sega Genesis games
Europe-exclusive video games
Manchester United F.C. media
Krisalis Software games
Ocean Software games
Super Nintendo Entertainment System games
Super Nintendo Entertainment System-only games
Top-down video games
Video games with isometric graphics
Multiplayer and single-player video games
Video games developed in the United Kingdom
Video games scored by Matt Furniss